The Metro Express, or Chengshi Kuaibao, originally named City Express (都市快报), was a Tianjin-based Chinese-language newspaper published in China. It was the only metro newspaper in Tianjin.

Metro Express was officially launched on March 1, 2004. On January 1, 2020, the newspaper stopped publication.

History
On March 1, 2004, Metro Express was launched by Tianjin Daily Press Group (天津日报报业集团). On January 1, 2020, it officially ceased publication.

References

Defunct newspapers published in China
Publications established in 2004
2004 establishments in China
Publications disestablished in 2020
2020 disestablishments in China